Ivanjevci is a village in the municipality of Mogila, North Macedonia.

Demographics
According to the 2002 census, the village had a total of 615 inhabitants. Ethnic groups in the village include:

Macedonians 611
Romani 3
Others 1

References

Villages in Mogila Municipality